Boots UK Limited (formerly Boots the Chemists), trading as Boots, is a British health and beauty retailer and pharmacy chain in the United Kingdom and other countries and territories including Ireland, Italy, Norway, the Netherlands, Thailand and Indonesia.

The parent company, The Boots Company plc, merged with Alliance UniChem in 2006 to form Alliance Boots. In 2007, Alliance Boots was bought by Kohlberg Kravis Roberts and Stefano Pessina, taking the company private, and moving its headquarters to Switzerland, making it the first-ever FTSE 100 company to be bought by a private equity firm. In 2012, Walgreens bought a 45% stake in Alliance Boots, with the option to buy the rest within three years. It exercised this option in 2014, and as a result Boots became a subsidiary of the new company, Walgreens Boots Alliance, on 31 December 2014.

Boots is one of the largest retailers in the UK and Ireland, both in terms of revenue and the number of shops. It has 2,200 shops across the United Kingdom and Ireland ranging from local pharmacies to large health and beauty shops in 2022. Its shops are primarily located on the high streets and in shopping centres. It sells many health and beauty products, and also provides optician and hearing care services within shops and as standalone practices. Boots also operates a retail website and a loyalty card programme called the Boots Advantage Card.

History

1849 to 2000

Boots was established in 1849, by John Boot. After his father's death in 1860, Jesse Boot, aged 10, helped his mother run the family's herbal medicine shop in Nottingham, which was incorporated as Boot and Co. Ltd in 1883, becoming Boots Pure Drug Company Ltd in 1888. In 1920, Jesse Boot sold the company to the American United Drug Company. However, because of deteriorating economic circumstances in North America Boots was sold back into British hands in 1933. The grandson of the founder, John Boot, who inherited the title Baron Trent from his father, headed the company. The Boots Pure Drug Company name was changed to The Boots Company Limited in 1971.

Between 1898 and 1966, many branches of Boots incorporated a lending library department, known as Boots Book-Lovers' Library.

Boots diversified into the research and manufacturing of drugs with its development of the Ibuprofen painkiller during the 1960s, invented by John Nicholson and Stewart Adams. The company was awarded the Queen's Award For Technical Achievement for this in 1987. A major research focus of Boots in the 1980s, was the drug for congestive heart failure, Manoplax. The withdrawal from market of Manoplax due to safety concerns in 1993, caused major pressure from investors, and in 1994, Boots divested its prescription drugs division, which had become no longer viable, to BASF. In 2006, it sold the Nurofen brand to Reckitt Benckiser. The 2006 sale of Boots Healthcare International included everything made by Crookes Healthcare, based on the Nottingham site.

In 1968, Boots acquired the 622-strong Timothy Whites and Taylors Ltd chain. Boots expanded into Canada by purchasing the Tamblyn Drugs chain circa 1978. Most Canadian Boots shops were converted to Pharma Plus in 1989, after sale to Oshawa Group, although a handful of locations remained as late as 1993, if not later. Boots products briefly surfaced in Canada when it was sold at the short-lived Target foray into Canada. In 1982, the company opened a new manufacturing plant in Cramlington, Northumberland. In the early 1990s, Boots began to diversify and bought Halfords, the bicycle and car parts business in 1991. It also developed the Children's World business of larger out of town superstores in the 1980s, but sold this chain to Mothercare in 1996. Halfords was sold in 2002.

Boots Opticians Ltd was formed in 1987, with the acquisition of Clement Clarke Ltd and Curry and Paxton Ltd. Boots Opticians became the UK's second-largest retail optics chain. In 2009, Boots Opticians acquired Dollond & Aitchison, an optician chain that was founded in 1750.

Boots diversified into dentistry in 1998, with a number of shops offering this service. Boots sold the Do-It-All DIY chain to Focus DIY in 1998. Boots also made a venture into "Wellbeing" services offering customers treatments ranging from facials, homoeopathy, and nutritional advice to laser eye surgery and Botox but these services were abandoned in 2003, despite a launch that included a dedicated Freeview and Sky TV channel of the same name, and even redirecting web traffic from boots.com to wellbeing.com

2000 to present

In late 2004, Boots sold its laser eye surgery business to Optical Express.

In October 2005, a merger with Alliance UniChem was announced by the then chairman, Sir Nigel Rudd. The CEO Richard Baker left, and the new group became Alliance Boots plc. The merger became effective on 31 July 2006.

Alliance Boots was purchased by Kohlberg Kravis Roberts and Stefano Pessina, the deputy chairman of the company, in April 2007 for £11.1 billion, taking the company private and beating a rival bid from Guy Hands's Terra Firma Capital Partners. This was the first ever instance of a FTSE 100 company having been bought by a private equity firm. In June 2008, the group headquarters were moved to Zug, Switzerland. According to John Ralfe, Boots' former head of corporate finance, "the UK has lost about £100m a year in tax as result".

'Boots the Chemists Limited' was re-registered under the name 'Boots UK Limited' on 1 October 2007. Management of all staff was moved to Boots Management Services Limited on 1 July 2010.

In June 2012, it was announced that Walgreens, the United States' largest chemist chain, would purchase a 45% stake in Alliance Boots for US$6.7 billion. The deal was said to be a long-term plan to give maximum exposure to both brands, Boots more so in the US and, Walgreens more so in the UK and in China through Boots' presence in that market. The deal gave the option to complete a full merger of the organisations within three years costing an extra $9.5bn. Walgreens confirmed on 6 August 2014, that it would purchase the remaining 55% and merge with Alliance Boots to form a new holding company, Walgreens Boots Alliance Inc. Walgreens and Boots both become subsidiaries of the new company on 31 December 2014.

In April 2019, Boots announced it would sponsor the England, Scotland, Wales, Northern Ireland and Republic of Ireland women's football teams in a multi-million pound/euro deal. The deal was to last three years and cover the 2019 FIFA Women's World Cup and the UEFA Women's Euro 2021 competitions.

In May 2019, Boots announced that it was closing 200+ underperforming shops.

Profits for 2019, were £167 million, 47.3% less than in 2018. The company blamed "lower volume and lower revenue item growth and continuing UK government reimbursement pressure".

In July 2020, the group announced that it would be cutting 4,000 jobs and shutting 48 optician stores in the UK.

Since September 2018, Sebastian James has been a senior vice president of Walgreens Boots Alliance, and president and managing director of Boots.

In November 2020, Boots Ireland appointed Stephen Watkins as managing director for Ireland succeeding Bernadette Lavery who has been appointed director of pharmacy with Boots UK.

Products and services
Boots sell the following products and services:
Prescription medicines sold via their pharmacies
Retail (non-prescription) medicines
Wide range of health and beauty products including related electrical products (hairdryers, shavers, electric toothbrushes)
Photography - Boots is an established provider of photography services. Traditionally the shops offered photographic processing services, but with the shift from film to digital photography, the shops now include kiosk printing services.
Clothing - baby and toddler ranges and maternity wear
Food and drink (branded as Boots Delicious) - most branches sell lunchtime food and drink products which are available as part of a "Meal Deal" promotion.
Opticians
Hearing care
Mental health  - in 2022 the company launched the Boots Online Doctor Depression & Anxiety Treatment which offers treatments for depression and anxiety for £65 per month.  This includes a GP consultation and access to medicines.  There is also a ‘SupportRoom’ offering psychological support by text message or video for  £40 per month and a ‘symptom checker’ questionnaire for patients, which is reviewed by a mental health professional.

Stores 

As of 31 August 2019, there were a total of 3,063 Boots stores across six countries:
 United Kingdom: 2,465
 Thailand: 293
 Norway: 159
 Republic of Ireland: 89
 Netherlands: 59
 Malta: 3
 Indonesia: 3

The Alshaya Group, a franchise operator based in Kuwait, operates a number of Boots-branded stores throughout the Middle East, including in Bahrain, Kuwait, Oman, Qatar, Saudi Arabia and the United Arab Emirates, while Boots-branded stores throughout Indonesia are operated by PT Mitra Adiperkasa Tbk.

Charity work
The company funds the Boots Charitable Trust, which is an independent registered charity in the UK, administrated by Nottinghamshire Community Foundation. The trust was established in the early 1970s, to fund registered charities benefiting people who live in Nottinghamshire.

Additionally, the company supports BBC Children in Need, Macmillan Cancer Support,
Supporting "WE Feel Good"  The Prince's Trust, The Boots Orchestra in Nottingham,   and the Boots Benevolent Fund.

The Boots Factory Site

The Boots Factory Site, near the Nottingham suburb of Beeston, features a range of listed buildings. This includes the two principal factory buildings, D6 and D10, designed by Sir Owen Williams and built in 1932, and 1935–1938, respectively. Both are Grade I listed. The former fire station of 1938, D34, is also by Williams and is Grade II listed. The headquarters office building known as D90 is Grade II* and was built to designs by Skidmore, Owings & Merrill in 1966–68. 

Staff have a restaurant, coffee and snack shops, newsagent, a branch of Boots the Chemist, an opticians branch and cash point situated within landscaped grounds. The grounds include the Millennium Garden, which features a herb garden (with some plants that Jesse used in his original herbal remedies) in the shape of a goose foot – harking back to Jesse's original shop on Goose Gate, Nottingham.

The Boots Museum is now closed; however, historical items are in storage or on display in the reception area of the D90 building.

Controversies

No. 7 Protect & Perfect Intense Beauty Serum 
Professor Chris Griffiths' University of Manchester team found the Serum, formerly, No. 7 Refine & Rewind Beauty Serum stimulated the production of fibrillin-1 and appeared to smooth out wrinkles, (published in the British Journal of Dermatology). In 2007, BBC Horizons independent investigation caused a run on a product in the same product range after it was found to be the only one to have a beneficial effect. Richard Weller, an Edinburgh University dermatologist, said it was unlikely to be as effective as prescription retinoids.

Sale of homeopathic products
In 2009, Boots Superintendent Pharmacist Paul Bennett was interviewed by the House of Commons Science and Technology Committee about the company's sale of homeopathic medicines. He told the committee that the company had no evidence to suggest that homeopathic medicines are efficacious but Boots sold them anyway, for reasons of "consumer choice". The comments attracted significant media attention.

In 2010, protesters staged a mass homeopathy ‘overdose’ outside Boots shops.

Charging the NHS for carrying out unnecessary medicine reviews
In April 2016, the Pharmacists' Defence Association stated that company managers were exploiting the NHS by insisting that each outlet carry out medicine use reviews, even if patients didn't need them.  The NHS pays £28 per review up to a maximum of 400 per shop per year.  The Guardian said that the General Pharmaceutical Council was poised to investigate.

2016 reports of workplace pressure
At the same time as the article about medicine reviews, The Guardian published a longer report on the same day called 'How Boots went Rogue', which told the story from the eyes of a Boots pharmacist talking about working conditions at the company. It also covered the buyout of the company and the owners' financial approach. Four days later it published an articles with emails from pharmacists. Pharmacists had written about how "the chain allegedly compels staff to compromise ethics for targets". The article said "The letters editor believes this may be the largest haul of mail he has ever received about a single article. Others rang in." There were two further follow-up articles in the days following. The paper subsequently noted a letter purporting to be from an "independent pharmacist" criticising its stance on the issue which it identified as having been edited and amended by one of the firm's vice-presidents. The letter was emailed as a Word document and contained tracked changes.

Following the Guardian reports, Boots announced the departure of UK operations director, Simon Roberts, in June 2016.

BBC documentary and press coverage in 2018
On 8 January 2018, the BBC showed a documentary called "Boots: Pharmacists under Pressure?" about the deaths of three patients following dispensing errors. It also featured accounts from three whistleblowers, who alleged that there were staffing issues at the company. One of the whistleblowers, who had formerly worked in a patient safety role, stated that Boots had calculated that in excess of £100m additional investment in staffing was required each year in its pharmacies and to meet the company's expectations of its staff. The BBC also published two articles on the same day.

A separate article almost three weeks later told the story of a patient who was given the wrong medicine in December 2017 by a "frazzled" pharmacist. The patient said there was clearly a staffing issue.

Boots had told the BBC documentary makers that there had been no further patient deaths associated with dispensing errors since 2015. However, in July 2018, it was reported that an error had occurred in 2016 in which two lots of the same medicines were dispensed and supplied to the same patient, Richard Lee, who subsequently died. The error was found at a coroner's inquest to have contributed to his death.

Supply of the "morning after pill"
In July 2017, the British Pregnancy Advisory Service (BPAS) revealed that Boots was selling emergency contraceptive medication at four times the cost price and had refused requests to join rival pharmacy retail chains, including Superdrug and Tesco, which had agreed to cease profiting financially in this way. In a written response to BPAS, Boots revealed that they were frequently contacted by individuals who disapproved of the dispensing of such medication, which might be viewed as "incentivising inappropriate use", an assertion which campaigners described as "insulting and sexist". BPAS called on the public to boycott the company and email them requesting that they reverse the policy. Following the boycott's launch, lawyers representing Boots alleged that the online complaint form created by BPAS had resulted in a "torrent of abuse" to five of Boots' senior managers and that BPAS had facilitated and tacitly encouraged harassment by naming individual staff members on the form. In response, BPAS stated that Boots had "failed to provide any evidence of abuse sent through the campaign". In November 2017, more than 130 Labour politicians signed a letter criticising Boots' failure to fulfil its promise to stock a low-cost alternative in its shops by October. At the end of January 2018, Boots confirmed that it was now offering the cheaper medication in all of its pharmacies.

Throughout the media coverage, a May–July 2017, pricelist from its wholesaler and sister company Alliance Healthcare stated that the "Normal Retail Price inc. VAT" of Levonelle One Step was £12.72.

Pharmacist suicide
On 25 October 2017, a debate was held in the House of Commons about pharmacists' mental health and the support that employers give to employees. Much of the discussion concerned the suicide of a Boots pharmacist, Alison Stamps, in May 2015, and Boots' response was criticised. Part of a letter from Alison Stamps’ parents was read out by MP Kevan Jones, which said: "It is clear that Alison was a victim of corporate greed and collateral damage by an uncaring company intent only on its own agenda."

Overcharging the NHS for products
In February 2018, Boots was criticised for charging excessive prices for low-value products supplied to the NHS: in one case, it was found that the pharmacy was billing in excess of £1,500 for a moisturiser which normally retailed at less than £2. In May 2018, a further investigation by The Times found that on at least five occasions between 2013 and 2017, Boots had charged over £3,200 for a medicinal mouthwash used to treat mouth ulcers in chemotherapy patients, in comparison to an independent supplier which had charged the equivalent of £93 for the same product. The investigation found that Boots had ordered the product from Alliance Healthcare, a supplier owned by Boots' parent company. In response,  a spokesman for Walgreens Boots Alliance rejected accusations of overcharging the NHS and claimed that the bespoke nature of the orders, often requested at short notice, results in the high cost.

Further reading
 Roberts, Cecil (1966) Achievement: a record of fifty years' progress of Boots Pure Drug Company Ltd London: Boots Pure Drug Company Ltd

See also
 Pharmaceutical industry in the United Kingdom

References

External links 

 
 

1849 establishments in England
British brands
Companies based in Nottingham
Retail companies established in 1849
Cosmetics brands
Cosmetics companies of the United Kingdom
Pharmaceutical companies of the United Kingdom
Pharmacies of the United Kingdom
Pharmacy brands
Private equity portfolio companies
Retail companies of the United Kingdom
British companies established in 1849
British subsidiaries of foreign companies
Walgreens Boots Alliance